Anne Cleary (born 1965 in Tullamore, Ireland) is an installation and video artist.

Work
Cleary and her partner Denis Connolly, both architects by education, have developed an art practice centred on observer participation. Their work addresses a heterogeneous public and often involves collaboration with artists from other disciplines, in particular dancers (such as Cindy Cummings), writers (such as the poet Derry O'Sullivan), musicians (such as DinahBird and Jean-Philippe Renaud) and craftsmen (such as carriage-builder Neil McKenzie). They are among Ireland’s foremost new-media artists, regularly incorporating innovative new technologies into their work to produce art that is both engaging and significant. Cleary Connolly’s work is always participatory art, both in its creative process and in its final engagement with the spectator. They coined the term “observer participation” to describe their work, affirming that an artwork is not just an observation on the world but an active participation in the world. Over the last five years they have been awarded more than a dozen public commissions, in Ireland, Britain and France, each involving a participative process as well as the creation and installation of one or several permanent artworks.
Their recent exhibitions include a 9-month show of three installations at the Casino at Marino, Dublin in 2013; a show in Spring 2013 celebrating the Irish presidency of the EU with installations at Hôtel de Ville, Paris and at the Irish College in Paris; and a show of five "Meta-perceptual Helmets" at the Natural History Museum (Ireland) in November 2014.  In 2008-2009 they had a 3-month show at the Centre Georges Pompidou in Paris. Publications include Moving Dublin, a book and DVD, published in April 2009 by Gandon Editions. They were awarded the 2009 AIB Award for Irish artists of exceptional potential. They live together in Paris with their twin daughters.

Publications
 2011 - In the Works Gandon Editions, Kinsale. 
 2009 - Moving Dublin incl. DVD. Gandon Editions, Kinsale. 
 2007 - Past and Presence incl. DVD. Gandon Editions, Kinsale.

Awards
 2009 - AIB Award for Irish artists of exceptional potential.
 2005 - EV+A 2005 award.
 2003 - Best Documentary Film Prize, Kerry Film Festival.
 2000 - Moving Image Award, Cork Film Centre, Cork.

References

External links
 Preview of the Meta-Perceptual Helmets in The Irish Times, 10 November 2014.
 Interview and presentation of Look Both Ways on France24, 8 April 2013.
 Review of The Absent Architect in The Irish Times, 29 May 2013.
Centre Pompidou Pourquoi Pas toi? 15 October 2008 - 12 January 2009
Circa 118 Review of Here There Now Then, LCGA, 2006.
cityloops.net Moving Dublin Project Site.
connolly-cleary.com presenting videos, texts and photos by the artists.

1965 births
Living people
Irish contemporary artists
20th-century Irish women artists
21st-century Irish women artists